Emmanuel Mouret (born 30 June 1970) is a French actor, director and screenwriter.

Life and career
He was born on 30 June 1970 in Marseille, Bouches-du-Rhône, Provence-Alpes-Côte d'Azur, France. He graduated from La Fémis (9th promotion, directing department).

Filmography

Actor
Caresse - 1998
Promène-toi donc tout nu! - 1999, as Clément
Laissons Lucie faire! - 2000, as Lucien
Venus and Fleur (Vénus et Fleur) - 2004, as Homme de la pelouse 2
Change of Address (Changement d'adresse) - 2006, as David
Shall We Kiss? (Un baiser s'il vous plaît) - 2007, as Nicolas
God's Offices (Les bureaux de Dieu) - 2008, as Pierre
Fais-moi plaisir! - 2009
The Art of Love (L'Art d'aimer) - 2011
Caprice - 2015

Director and screenwriter
Caresse - 1998
Promène-toi donc tout nu! - 1999
Laissons Lucie faire! - 2000
Venus and Fleur (Vénus et Fleur) - 2004
Change of Address (Changement d'adresse) - 2006
Shall We Kiss? (Un baiser s'il vous plaît) - 2007
God's Offices (Les bureaux de Dieu) - 2008
Fais-moi plaisir! - 2009
The Art of Love (L'Art d'aimer) - 2011
Another Life (Une autre vie) - 2013
Caprice - 2015
Mademoiselle de Joncquières - 2018
The Things We Say, the Things We Do - 2020
Diary of a Fleeting Affair - 2022

Awards and nominations
 2006 Tokyo Film Festival Tokyo Grand Prix for Changement d'adresse (2006)

References

External links
 

1970 births
Living people
French film directors
French male film actors
French male screenwriters
French screenwriters
Mass media people from Marseille
20th-century French male actors
21st-century French male actors